KSGL (900 AM) is a Religious/Adult Standards music formatted radio station licensed in Wichita, Kansas, and is owned by Agape Communications Inc.

History
KSGL's format history includes Top 40 as KEYN-AM, mostly simulcasting with its FM counterpart KEYN-FM.

In 1977, the KEYN-AM call letters and Top 40 format moved from AM 900 to AM 1410 (formally KWBB in the 1960s and early-1970s and would be the future sister station to KSGL). AM 900 became KSGL and signed on with a Christian format, the first station to carry the format in Wichita since there were no other stations in the market that carried Christian programming full-time on the radio at the time.

KSGL's Christian programming still airs to this day with an addition of Adult Standards music in different dayparts. The Adult Standards format was previously aired on its former sister station KMYR-1410 which was sold to Steckline Communications and is now Sports KGSO.

External links
FCC History Cards for KSGL

SGL
SGL
Radio stations established in 1977
1977 establishments in Kansas